The Key Man (released in the USA as Life at Stake) is a 1957 British B movie. The film was shot in black and white during a three week period in 1957 in response to an initiative by Anglo-Amalgamated to increase the number of British made B movies available. Directed by Montgomery Tully, the screenplay was adapted from his own original story by Julian MacLaren-Ross. MacLaren-Ross had been persuaded by producer Alec C. Snowden to write a script in late 1956 and after some doubts about the project delivered a screenplay to Snowden in January 1957, filming was started and completed the next month.

The film was subsequently released in the USA by United Artists under the title Life at Stake. The story was adapted as a radio play and broadcast on the BBC Home Service in August 1960.

Plot and reception
The film starts with footage of VE Day and crowds singing the Hokey Cokey and Auld Lang Syne.

Lee Patterson plays the lead character, Lionel Hulme, a radio reporter who is trying to trace both the man who committed a robbery 12 years ago (Arthur Smithers) as well as the proceeds of the robbery. Arthur has apparently been discussing a key in his sleep in prison.

Hy Hazell plays the wife of the man Hulme is trying to find and Colin Gordon plays Hulme's boss. Reviews of the film were slight, the Monthly Film Bulletin described the film as "... indistinguishable from numerous others of its type; the plot and development are very slight; and the characters negative" with an overall rating of poor.

Cast
Lee Patterson as Lionel Hulme
Paula Byrne as Pauline Hulme
Colin Gordon as Larry Parr
Hy Hazell as Gaby aka Eva Smithers
Philip Leaver as Smithers
Maudie Edwards as Mrs. Glass
Harold Kasket as Mr Dimitriadi, the barber
George Margo as Jeff
Henri Vidon as Haddow (as Henry Vidon)
Ian Wilson as Process Server
Dennis Castle as Police Inspector

References

External links 
 

Films about journalists
British black-and-white films
Films shot in London
1950s English-language films